Hayley Price is a British gymnast. She was born on 13 April 1966 in Wolverhampton, Staffordshire, England. She represented the United Kingdom in the 1984 Summer Olympics.

References

Olympic gymnasts of Great Britain
1966 births
Gymnasts at the 1984 Summer Olympics
Sportspeople from Wolverhampton
Living people
British female artistic gymnasts
20th-century British women